In aesthetics, the concept of taste has been the interest of philosophers such as Plato, Hume and Kant. 

In his aesthetic philosophy, Kant denies any standard of a good taste, which would be the taste of the majority or any social group. For Kant, as discussed in his book titled the Critique of Judgment, beauty is not a property of any object, but an aesthetic judgement based on a subjective feeling. He claims that a genuine good taste does exist, though it could not be empirically identified. Good taste cannot be found in any standards or generalizations, and the validity of a judgement is not the general view of the majority or some specific social group. Taste is both personal and beyond reasoning, and therefore disputing over matters of taste never reaches any universality. Kant stresses that our preferences, even on generally liked things, do not justify our judgements. Bourdieu argued against the Kantian view of pure aesthetics, stating that the legitimate taste of the society is the taste of the ruling class. This position also rejects the idea of genuine good taste, as the legitimate taste is merely a class taste. This idea was also proposed by Simmel, who noted that the upper classes abandon fashions as they are adopted by lower ones.

Bad taste 

Bad taste (also poor taste or even vulgar) is generally a title given to any object or idea that does not fall within the moralizing person's idea of the normal social standards of the time or area. Varying from society to society, and from time to time, bad taste is generally thought of as a negative thing, but that also changes with each individual.

A contemporary view—a retrospective review of literature—is that "a good deal of dramatic verse written during the Elizabethan and Jacobean periods is in poor taste because it is bombast [high-sounding language with little meaning]".

See also 
 Artistic merit
 Censorship
Western canon

Notes

References

External links

 Aesthetic Taste, Internet Encyclopedia of Philosophy

Sociological terminology
Concepts in aesthetics